Šenkovec is a municipality in Međimurje County, Croatia, located just outside the county seat, Čakovec.

The municipality includes two villages – Šenkovec and Knezovec. In the 2011 census, the two villages were populated by a total of 2,879 people, most of whom are Croats. The seat of the municipality is in Šenkovec, a suburban village located approximately 2 kilometers to the north-west from the centre of Čakovec. The main road between Čakovec and Mursko Središće goes through the village.

The village of Šenkovec has its own elementary school and kindergarten, as well as a sports hall and library. The pulmonology department of the Čakovec County Hospital is located in the Ksajpa neighbourhood of Šenkovec. There are two chapels in the municipality – the Holy Trinity Chapel in Šenkovec and the Saint Florian Chapel in Knezovec. The old Saint Jelena Chapel in Šenkovec is a listed building.

References

External links
Official website of the Municipality of Šenkovec (in Croatian)

Municipalities of Croatia
Populated places in Međimurje County